Mati Vaarmann (born on 14 September 1951) is an Estonian diplomat.

In 1973 he graduated from Tallinn Polytechnical Institute.

Since 1992 he is working for Estonian Foreign Ministry. 1997-2001 he was Ambassador of Estonia to Finland.  Since 2010 he was Ambassador of Estonia to Latvia.

In 2006 he was awarded with Order of the White Star, III class.

References

Living people
1951 births
Estonian diplomats
Ambassadors of Estonia to Finland
Ambassadors of Estonia to Latvia
Tallinn University of Technology alumni
Recipients of the Order of the White Star, 3rd Class